Children's Island is a Swedish drama film which was released to cinemas in Sweden on 25 December 1980, directed by Kay Pollak, starring Thomas Fryk and Ingvar Hirdwall. It is based on the novel of the same name by P. C. Jersild. Filming took place between July and October 1979. It won Sweden's most prestigious film prize, the Guldbagge, when it was released in 1980 and was Sweden's official selection for the 54th Academy Awards. The film became controversial in Australia, being banned in 2014, over thirty years after its original release.

Plot
The story is set in Stockholm where 11-year-old Reine is on the verge of puberty and afraid of sexual maturity. He lives in a suburb with his single mother who sends him to one of the traditional Swedish summer camps which were common at the time of the setting and were managed by the cities for children in need of visiting the countryside. The title of the film refers to an island that is home to many such camps. His mother then vacations on her own, but in fact Reine never goes to the camp. Instead he spends the summer exploring the city of Stockholm on his own, where he meets several strange adults.

Cast
 Tomas Fryk as Reine Larsson
 Ingvar Hirdwall as Stig Utler
 Anita Ekström as Harriet Larsson
 Börje Ahlstedt as Hester
 Lars-Erik Berenett as Esbjörn
 Hjördis Petterson as Olga
 Sif Ruud as Mrs. Bergman-Ritz
 Lena Granhagen as Helen
 Majlis Granlund as Lotten
 Malin Ek as Kristina
 Maud Sjökvist as Maria
 Hélène Svedberg as Nora

Awards
The movie was Kay Pollak's first commercial success, and won the awards for Best Film, Best Director and Best Actor (Hirdwall) at the 17th Guldbagge Awards. In 1981 it was entered into the 31st Berlin International Film Festival. The film was also selected as the Swedish entry for the Best Foreign Language Film at the 54th Academy Awards, but was not accepted as a nominee.

See also
 List of submissions to the 54th Academy Awards for Best Foreign Language Film
 List of Swedish submissions for the Academy Award for Best Foreign Language Film

References

External links
 
 
 copy of the film with English subtitles at the Internet Archive

1980 films
1980s coming-of-age drama films
1980s Swedish-language films
Films directed by Kay Pollak
Films set in Stockholm
Best Film Guldbagge Award winners
Films whose director won the Best Director Guldbagge Award
Swedish coming-of-age drama films
Film controversies in Australia
Obscenity controversies in film
Juvenile sexuality in films
1980 drama films
Films about puberty
1980s Swedish films